The American Peace Award is awarded to American citizens working to further the cause of world peace.

The 1924 American Peace Award 
The American Peace Award was created in 1923 by Edward Bok, who believed that the United States government was not taking initiative to promote peace in the world. $100,000 was to be awarded to the person submitting "the best practicable plan by which the United States may co-operate with other nations for the achievement and preservation of world peace." The first half of the prize was awarded upon the selection of the plan by a jury, and the remainder upon acceptance by the United States Senate or showing "sufficient popular support". The 1924 American Peace Award received plans from thousands of applicants, and caught the interest of the Senate.

Franklin D. Roosevelt drafted a plan for the contest but did not submit it because his wife Eleanor Roosevelt was selected as a judge for the prize. His plan called for a new world organization that would replace the League of Nations. Although Roosevelt  had been the vice presidential candidate on the Democratic ticket of 1920 that supported the League of Nations, by 1924 he was ready to scrap it. His draft of a "Society of Nations" accepted the reservations proposed by Henry Cabot Lodge in the 1919 Senate debate. The new Society would not become involved in the Western Hemisphere, where the Monroe doctrine held sway. It would not have any control over any military forces.  Although Roosevelt's plan was never made public, he thought about the problem a great deal, and incorporated some of his 1924 ideas into his design for the United Nations in 1944-1945.

The prize was awarded in February 1924 to Dr. Charles Herbert Levermore, who was secretary of the World Court League, the League of Nations Union, and the New York Peace Society, and former president of Adelphi College. Levermore's plan suggested the United States adhere to the Permanent Court of International Justice and should extend its cooperation with the League of Nations.

The contemporary American Peace Award 
The American Peace Award was established in 2008 as a prize awarded to an American citizen or citizens working to further the cause of world peace, in the spirit of Edward W. Bok's original award. The American Peace Award is awarded by an advisory committee of artists, who present each recipient with an original work of art to honor their efforts.

Recipients 
2008 – Cindy Sheehan
2009 – Rosalynn Carter and Jimmy Carter
2010 – Greg Mortenson
2011 – Roy Bourgeois

See also 
Ellen Fitz Pendleton, first woman to serve as juror to award the American Peace Prize (1923).

References

Further reading

 Bok, Edward W. "The Winning Plan: No. 1469 Selected by Jury of American Peace Award." Advocate of Peace through Justice 86.2 (1924): 86-92. online
 Bok, Edward W., et al. "The Winning American Peace Award Plan." American Bar Association Journal 10.1 (1924): 64-68. online
 DeBenedetti, Charles. "The $100,000 American peace award of 1924." Pennsylvania Magazine of History and Biography 98.2 (1974): 224-249. online
 "Plan, Bok Peace," University Debaters' Annual 10 (1924): 249+. online
 Rowe, L. S. "The American Peace Award." Annals of the American Academy of Political and Social Science 109 (1923): 307-310. online
 Tryon, James L. Ways to Peace. Twenty plans selected from the most representative of those submitted to the American Peace Award for the best practicable plan by which the United States may cooperate with other nations to achieve and preserve the peace of the world, with an Introduction by Esther Everett Lape, member in charge of the Policy Committee, and a Preface by Edward W. Bok, founder of the award (Charles Scribner's Sons, 1924). pp. xviii, 465.
 Willis, Hugh Evander. "The Road to World Peace: A Plan by Which the United States May Cooperate with Other Nations to Achieve and Preserve the Peace of the World." 58 American Law Review 551 (1924) online

External links

Peace awards